John Clyve was an English gothic architect, responsible for the nave, tower  and west front of Worcester Cathedral. He is mentioned as a mason in connection with the cathedral cloisters circa 1376/77.

References 

14th-century English architects
Gothic architects
Year of death unknown
Year of birth unknown
Stonemasons
Architects from Worcestershire